The ARIA Albums Chart ranks the best-performing albums and extended plays (EPs) in Australia. Its data, published by the Australian Recording Industry Association, is based collectively on the weekly physical and digital sales of albums and EPs. In 2018, 25 albums have claimed the top spot, including Ed Sheeran's ÷, which spent 21 weeks at number one on the chart in 2017. Nine acts, Geoffrey Gurrumul Yunupingu, J. Cole, Post Malone, Shawn Mendes, Sheppard, Amy Shark, Travis Scott, Twenty One Pilots and Bradley Cooper, achieved their first number-one album in Australia.

Chart history

Number-one artists

See also
2018 in music
List of number-one singles of 2018 (Australia)

References

2018
Australia albums
Number-one albums